Oxytrechus is a genus of beetles in the family Carabidae, containing the following species:

 Oxytrechus alexei Delgado & Ruiz-Tapiador, 2019
 Oxytrechus andersoni Giachino & Allegro, 2021
 Oxytrechus arechavaletae (Putzeys, 1870)
 Oxytrechus atahualpai Giachino & Allegro, 2021
 Oxytrechus balli Allegro, Giachino & Sciaky, 2008
 Oxytrechus bavierai Giachino & Allegro, 2021
 Oxytrechus belloi Giachino, Allegro & Baviera, 2014
 Oxytrechus bousqueti Mateu, 1991
 Oxytrechus campbelli Mateu, 1991
 Oxytrechus caucaensis Mateu, 1991
 Oxytrechus cayambeensis Quéinnec & Ollivier, 2019
 Oxytrechus chioriae Quéinnec & Ollivier, 2019
 Oxytrechus convexus Mateu, 1991
 Oxytrechus cyathiderus Jeannel, 1954
 Oxytrechus equatorianus Mateu, 1988
 Oxytrechus fasciger (Putzeys, 1870)
 Oxytrechus fikaceki Giachino & Moret, 2021
 Oxytrechus floresanus Giachino & Allegro, 2021
 Oxytrechus gitzeni M.Etonti, 2002
 Oxytrechus globosus Mateu, 1991
 Oxytrechus guaguanus Mateu, 1991
 Oxytrechus jeanneli Mateu, 1991
 Oxytrechus juani Delgado & Ruiz-Tapiador, 2019
 Oxytrechus lallemandi Jeannel, 1927
 Oxytrechus llanganatisianus Mateu, 1988
 Oxytrechus Mateui Allegro, Giachino & Sciaky, 2008
 Oxytrechus Moreti Mateu, 1988
 Oxytrechus norae Mateu, 1982
 Oxytrechus onorei Allegro, Giachino & Sciaky, 2008
 Oxytrechus osellai Giachino, Allegro & Baviera, 2014
 Oxytrechus paredesi M.Etonti & Mateu, 1992
 Oxytrechus pichinchanus Mateu, 1988
 Oxytrechus pierremoreti Allegro, Giachino & Sciaky, 2008
 Oxytrechus reventadori Moret, 2005
 Oxytrechus ruizianus Giachino & Allegro, 2021
 Oxytrechus sciakyi Giachino & Allegro, 2021
 Oxytrechus silvianus Mateu, 1991
 Oxytrechus solitarius Mateu, 1991
 Oxytrechus vulcanus Mateu, 1988
 Oxytrechus zoiai Casale & Sciaky, 1986

References

Trechinae